Mohawk 4 Ice Centre is a recreation complex located in Mohawk Sports Park on Mountain Brow Boulevard near Mohawk Road East in Hamilton, Ontario, Canada.

A conservative estimate of attendance in a single season of use for The Mohawk 4 Ice Centre is over 1,500,000 attendees. 

It is also the home of the Stoney Creek Oldtimers Hockey Association, Hamilton Junior Bulldogs and the Civic Employees Hockey League. It is also the home of Nustadia Recreational Hockey League.

It is the Premier Skating & Hockey training facility in the city. A number of workshops are held there and these include; Pro Hockey Life Academy, and a number of power skating programs, Velenosi Powerskating, and Kelly Reed Hockey
A number of Hamilton area NHL and pro hockey players use the facility for off-season training.

Images

See also
 List of sports venues in Hamilton, Ontario

References

External links 
 

Indoor arenas in Ontario
Indoor ice hockey venues in Canada
Sports venues in Hamilton, Ontario
Public–private partnership projects in Canada